Center Township is one of twelve townships in Boone County, Indiana. As of the 2010 census, its population was 18,030 and it contained 7,934 housing units. It was named from its location at the geographic center of Boone County.

History
Andrew B. VanHuys Round Barn was listed on the National Register of Historic Places in 1993.

Geography

Cities and towns
 Lebanon (the county seat)
 Ulen

Unincorporated towns
 Brendan Wood
 Dale
 Hazel College
 Northfield Village
 Stringtown
(This list is based on USGS data and may include former settlements.)

Adjacent townships
 Clinton (northeast)
 Harrison (southwest)
 Jackson (southwest)
 Jefferson (west)
 Marion (northeast)
 Perry (southeast)
 Union (east)
 Washington (northwest)
 Worth (southeast)

Major highways
  Interstate 65
  U.S. Route 52
  Indiana State Road 32
  Indiana State Road 39

Cemeteries
The township contains four cemeteries: Center, Dowden, Oak Hill and Robinson.

References
 
 United States Census Bureau cartographic boundary files

External links

 Indiana Township Association
 United Township Association of Indiana

Townships in Boone County, Indiana
Townships in Indiana